Robert Newman (born June 27, 1958) is an American actor, primarily appearing on television.

Guiding Light 
Newman is best known for his role as Joshua Lewis on the American soap opera Guiding Light, a role he played from 1981 to 1984, and again from 1986 to 1991, and 1993 to the series finale in September 2009.

The character of Josh was initially introduced as a bad boy of sorts. With the 1983 arrival of Reva Shayne, played by Kim Zimmer, Josh and Reva became a popular "supercouple". Newman and Zimmer's characters became a principal couple on the show. Their characters were reciting the show's final dialogue to one another in the scene's final moments.

During his collective run on the show, Newman was also paired with other actresses, including Michelle Forbes (Sonni), Beth Ehlers (Harley), Marcy Walker (Tangie), Cynthia Watros (Annie), Crystal Chappell (Olivia), and Nicole Forester (Cassie).

Other daytime roles, accomplishments, and current work 

In addition to his role on Guiding Light, Newman also played the characters of Prescott Harrell on General Hospital in 1985, and Kirk Cranston, replacing Joseph Bottoms, on Santa Barbara in 1986.

Newman has been nominated for four Soap Opera Digest awards for his role as Josh Lewis. He has also been nominated for two Daytime Emmy Awards in 2002 and 2006, both times in the category of Outstanding Lead Actor in a Drama Series.

After Guiding Light concluded, Newman focused on stage work, including a production of Peter Pan, in the role of Captain Hook, as Guido Contini in a 2004 production of the musical Nine and in Ira Levin's Death Trap at The Barn Theatre in Augusta, Michigan. Newman has also appeared in several productions of Gypsy as Herbie. In 2011, he played the role opposite Tovah Feldshuh at the Bristol Riverside Theater. He reprised Herbie opposite Guiding Light co-star Kim Zimmer in a 2015 Pittsburgh Civic Light Opera production.

In January 2022, Newman joined the cast of CBS daytime drama The Young and the Restless in the recast role of Ashland Locke, after actor Richard Burgi was terminated from the show.

See also
Guiding Light
Josh Lewis and Reva Shayne
Supercouple

References

External links

American male soap opera actors
1958 births
Living people
Male actors from Los Angeles
California State University, Northridge alumni
20th-century American male actors
American male film actors
21st-century American male actors
American male television actors